Imantodes chocoensis, the Chocoan blunt-headed vine snake  s a species of snake in the family Colubridae.  The species is native to Ecuador and Colombia.

References

Imantodes
Snakes of South America
Reptiles of Ecuador
Reptiles of Colombia
Reptiles described in 2012